Quinzano d'Oglio is a comune in the province of Brescia, in Lombardy, northern Italy. The river Oglio runs across its territory, separating Quinzano from the province of Cremona.

References

Cities and towns in Lombardy